In physics and engineering, the time constant, usually denoted by the Greek letter  (tau), is the parameter characterizing the response to a step input of a first-order, linear time-invariant (LTI) system. The time constant is the main characteristic unit of a first-order LTI system.

In the time domain, the usual choice to explore the time response is through the step response to a step input, or the impulse response to a Dirac delta function input. In the frequency domain (for example, looking at the Fourier transform of the step response, or using an input that is a simple sinusoidal function of time) the time constant also determines the bandwidth of a first-order time-invariant system, that is, the frequency at which the output signal power drops to half the value it has at low frequencies.

The time constant is also used to characterize the frequency response of various signal processing systems – magnetic tapes, radio transmitters and receivers, record cutting and replay equipment, and digital filters – which can be modelled or approximated by first-order LTI systems. Other examples include time constant used in control systems for integral and derivative action controllers, which are often pneumatic, rather than electrical.

Time constants are a feature of the lumped system analysis (lumped capacity analysis method) for thermal systems, used when objects cool or warm uniformly under the influence of convective cooling or warming.

In an increasing system, the time constant is the time for the system's step response to reach  of its final (asymptotic) value (say from a step increase). In radioactive decay the time constant is related to the decay constant (λ), and it represents both the mean lifetime of a decaying system (such as an atom) before it decays, or the time it takes for all but 36.8% of the atoms to decay. For this reason, the time constant is longer than the half-life, which is the time for only 50% of the atoms to decay.

Differential equation

First order LTI systems are characterized by the differential equation

The Heaviside step function, often denoted by :

or

Example solution
An example solution to the differential equation with initial value  and no forcing function is

where

Thus, the response is an exponential decay with time constant .

Discussion

Suppose

This behavior is referred to as a "decaying" exponential function. The time  (tau) is referred to as the "time constant" and can be used (as in this case) to indicate how rapidly an exponential function decays.

Here: 
 is time (generally  in control engineering)
 is the initial value (see "specific cases" below).

Specific cases

 Let ; then , and so 
 Let ; then 
 Let , and so 
 Let ; then 
After a period of one time constant the function reaches  = approximately 37% of its initial value. In case 4, after five time constants the function reaches a value less than 1% of its original. In most cases this 1% threshold is considered sufficient to assume that the function has decayed to zero – as a rule of thumb, in control engineering a stable system is one that exhibits such an overall damped behavior.

Relation of time constant to bandwidth

Suppose the forcing function is chosen as sinusoidal so:

(Response to a real cosine or sine wave input can be obtained by taking the real or imaginary part of the final result by virtue of Euler's formula.) The general solution to this equation for times , assuming  is:

For long times the decaying exponentials become negligible and the steady-state solution or long-time solution is:

The magnitude of this response is:

By convention, the bandwidth of this system is the frequency where  drops to half-value, or where . This is the usual bandwidth convention, defined as the frequency range where power drops by less than half (at most −3 dB). Using the frequency in hertz, rather than radians/s:

Thus, the time constant determines the bandwidth of this system.

Step response with arbitrary initial conditions

Suppose the forcing function is chosen as a step input so:

with  the Heaviside step function. The general solution to this equation for times , assuming  is:

(It may be observed that this response is the  limit of the above response to a sinusoidal input.)

The long-time solution is time independent and independent of initial conditions:

The time constant remains the same for the same system regardless of the starting conditions. Simply stated, a system approaches its final, steady-state situation at a constant rate, regardless of how close it is to that value at any arbitrary starting point.

For example, consider an electric motor whose startup is well modelled by a first-order LTI system.  Suppose that when started from rest, the motor takes  of a second to reach 63% of its nominal speed of 100 RPM, or 63 RPM—a shortfall of 37 RPM.  Then it will be found that after the next  of a second, the motor has sped up an additional 23 RPM, which equals 63% of that 37 RPM difference.  This brings it to 86 RPM—still 14 RPM low.  After a third  of a second, the motor will have gained an additional 9 RPM (63% of that 14 RPM difference), putting it at 95 RPM.

In fact, given any initial speed   of a second later this particular motor will have gained an additional

Examples

Time constants in electrical circuits

In an RL circuit composed of a single resistor and inductor, the time constant  (in seconds) is 

where R is the resistance (in ohms) and L is the inductance (in henrys).

Similarly, in an RC circuit composed of a single resistor and capacitor, the time constant  (in seconds) is:

where R is the resistance (in ohms) and C is the capacitance (in farads).

Electrical circuits are often more complex than these examples, and may exhibit multiple time constants (See Step response and Pole splitting for some examples.) In the case where feedback is present, a system may exhibit unstable, increasing oscillations. In addition, physical electrical circuits are seldom truly linear systems except for very low amplitude excitations; however, the approximation of linearity is widely used.

In digital electronic circuits another measure, the FO4 is often used.  This can be converted to time constant units via the equation .

Thermal time constant

Time constants are a feature of the lumped system analysis (lumped capacity analysis method) for thermal systems, used when objects cool or warm uniformly under the influence of convective cooling or warming. In this case, the heat transfer from the body to the ambient at a given time is proportional to the temperature difference between the body and the ambient:

where h is the heat transfer coefficient, and As is the surface area, T is the temperature function, i.e., T(t) is the body temperature at time t, and Ta is the constant ambient temperature. The positive sign indicates the convention that F is positive when heat is leaving the body because its temperature is higher than the ambient temperature (F is an outward flux). If heat is lost to the ambient, this heat transfer leads to a drop in temperature of the body given by:

where ρ = density, cp = specific heat and V is the body volume. The negative sign indicates the temperature drops when the heat transfer is outward from the body (that is, when F > 0). Equating these two expressions for the heat transfer,

Evidently, this is a first-order LTI system that can be cast in the form:

with

In other words, larger masses ρV with higher heat capacities cp lead to slower changes in temperature (longer time constant τ), while larger surface areas As with higher heat transfer h lead to more rapid temperature change (shorter time constant τ).

Comparison with the introductory differential equation suggests the possible generalization to time-varying ambient temperatures Ta. However, retaining the simple constant ambient example, by substituting the variable ΔT ≡ (T − Ta), one finds:

Systems for which cooling satisfies the above exponential equation are said to satisfy Newton's law of cooling. The solution to this equation suggests that, in such systems, the difference between the temperature of the system and its surroundings ΔT as a function of time t, is given by:

 

where ΔT0 is the initial temperature difference, at time t = 0. In words, the body assumes the same temperature as the ambient at an exponentially slow rate determined by the time constant.

Time constants in Biophysics
In an excitable cell such as a muscle or neuron, the time constant of the membrane potential  is

where rm is the resistance across the membrane and cm is the capacitance of the membrane.

The resistance across the membrane is a function of the number of open ion channels and the capacitance is a function of the properties of the lipid bilayer.

The time constant is used to describe the rise and fall of membrane voltage, where the rise is described by

and the fall is described by

Vmax is defined as the maximum voltage change from the resting potential, where 

where rm is the resistance across the membrane and I is the membrane current.

Setting for t =  for the rise sets V(t) equal to 0.63Vmax. This means that the time constant is the time elapsed after 63% of Vmax has been reached

Setting for t =  for the fall sets V(t) equal to 0.37Vmax, meaning that the time constant is the time elapsed after it has fallen to 37% of Vmax.

The larger a time constant is, the slower the rise or fall of the potential of a neuron. A long time constant can result in temporal summation, or the algebraic summation of repeated potentials. A short time constant rather produces a coincidence detector through spatial summation.

Exponential decay

In exponential decay, such as of a radioactive isotope, the time constant can be interpreted as the mean lifetime. The half-life THL is related to the exponential time constant  by

The reciprocal of the time constant is called the decay constant, and is denoted

Meteorological sensors
A time constant is the amount of time it takes for a meteorological sensor to respond to a rapid change in a measure, and until it is measuring values within the accuracy tolerance usually expected of the sensor.

This most often applies to measurements of temperature, dew-point temperature, humidity and air pressure. Radiosondes are especially affected due to their rapid increase in altitude.

See also
RC time constant
Cutoff frequency
Exponential decay
Lead–lag compensator
Length constant
Rise time
Fall time
Frequency response
Impulse response
Step response
Rise time
Settling time

Notes

References

External links

Conversion of time constant τ to cutoff frequency fc and vice versa
All about circuits - Voltage and current calculations
Energy and Thermal Time Constant of Buildings

Physical constants
Neuroscience